Ferdinand Joseph Fonseca (December 2, 1925 – October 2, 2015) was a Roman Catholic bishop.

Ordained to the priesthood in 1954, Fonseca was named auxiliary bishop for the Roman Catholic Archdiocese of Bombay, India in 1980 and retired in 2000.

Notes

1925 births
2015 deaths
20th-century Roman Catholic bishops in India